Sira Jenjaka (born 5 January 1964) is a Thai politician. In 2019, he was elected to the 25th House of Representatives of the National Assembly of Thailand.

He was a member of the anti-corruption panel of the House of Representatives. He left the panel after disagreements with the panel’s chairman Sereepisuth Temeeyaves.

In January 2021, the Constitutional Court received a petition for him to be removed from parliament because of an alleged prior fraud conviction, which would mean he was not eligible to seek election during the 2019 Thai general election. The petition was deemed appropriate, and thus Sira was deposed from the National Assembly, with 20 year bans from any political rights and recall of any undue gainings followed up.

References 

Living people
1964 births
Place of birth missing (living people)
Sira Jenjaka
Sira Jenjaka
Sira Jenjaka